The Journal of Quaternary Science is a peer-reviewed academic journal published on behalf of the Quaternary Research Association. It covers research on any aspect of quaternary science. The journal publishes predominantly research articles with two thematic issues published annually, although discussions and letters are occasionally published along with invited reviews. According to the Journal Citation Reports, the journal has a 2012 impact factor of 2.939.

See also 
 Boreas – An International Journal of Quaternary Research

References

English-language journals
Wiley-Blackwell academic journals
Publications established in 1986
Quaternary science journals
Academic journals associated with learned and professional societies